Pirče  may refer to the following places:

In Kosovo:

 Pirče, Mitrovica, a settlement in the Municipality of Mitrovica

In Slovenia:

 Pirče, Kostel, a settlement in the Municipality of Kostel

See also
 Poljana